Overlook Hospital is a 504-bed non-profit teaching hospital located in Summit, New Jersey, United States, 20 miles west of New York City. On a hill in the center of the city, the hospital is one of Summit's three largest employers and offers medical services to Summit and surrounding communities in Northern New Jersey.

History
Overlook Hospital was founded in 1906 by Dr. William Henry Lawrence, Jr., who, at the age of 26, bought the Faitoute property on the "highest point in Summit" overlooking the Baltusrol Valley and which was only ten minutes walk away from the train station. He borrowed $15,000 from three civic leaders to build the three-story structure which housed an operating room, x-ray facility, and hydraulically powered elevator. The hospital began with 42 beds, and cost approximately $30,000 in total. According to one account, the hospital was privately owned but had a policy of caring for "all proper and deserving cases whether able to pay or not, and to take emergency cases at all times."

In the 1960s, doctors experimented with new techniques; in one instance, doctors authorized use of alcoholic beverages to delay the onset of contractions of a pregnant woman. The Valerie Fund Children's Center was established in 1977 through the efforts of Edwin and Susan Goldstein of Warren after their 9-year-old daughter, Valerie, died of bone cancer. When it opened, it was the first of its kind in New Jersey. By 1987, it had three doctors, three resident nurses, a social worker and support staff. It treats "youngsters with various forms of cancer and rare blood disorders."

In 1989, tennis star Tracy Austin was brought to the emergency department following a car accident, and was treated and released. In 1991, Overlook was estimated to have 30,000 emergency department visits annually, with 600 staff physicians and admits of 20,000 patients annually, and 170,000 to 200,000 outpatient visits annually, according to one source. Overlook began a brain tumor center in 1999. It had 538 beds in 2003. The hospital sometimes treats victims of freak accidents; for example, in 2005 at the PGA Golf Championship Golf at the Baltusrol Golf Club, a tree branch toppled and seriously hurt one man who was taken to Overlook.

Description

Overview
Overlook Hospital is part of Atlantic Health System which also runs the Morristown Medical Center. Overlook is located in Summit, NJ. One estimate (2009) is that it had 832 doctors and dentists. It has 490 beds. A second estimate is there were 504 beds. Another estimate was that Overlook and Morristown hospitals together had 1,076 beds. It did 7,128 surgeries in 2008. It did 3,092 deliveries of infants in 2008. Another estimate (2009) was that Overlook, along with Morristown Memorial Hospital, delivered 6,300 newborns annually. It had 36,812 emergency department visits in 2008. It did 172,853 outpatient procedures in 2008. Overlook has a parking lot. It has a cafeteria, chapel, and gift and flower shop. Overlook has a helipad. Since the hospital is on a hill, there are few obstructions for helicopter blades. In October 2009, Overlook president Alan Lieber sent a letter to residents of Summit urging them to support a helipad to reduce travel time for stroke patients in the area.

Visiting hours are from 11am to 8pm for family members, with some exceptions. In the maternity ward, parents can visit 24 hours a day. For non-family members, visiting hours are 6pm to 8pm weekdays. Only family members are allowed to visit patients in the Labor and Delivery ward, Intensive Care Unit, Neuro Intensive Care Unit, Cardiac Care unit, and the Neo-Natal intensive care unit.

Overlook has doctors who specialize in pain management. Overlook doctors have been quoted in news reports. Some Overlook speech clinicians offer "accent reduction lessons." According to one source, Overlook gets a large number of transports involving high-risk pregnancies and sick infants. Hospital doctors sometimes comment on controversial topics such as Do Not Resuscitate decisions. Overlook offers an educational class entitled Go Baby Green which helps parents identify products that may pose a hazard to babies. One Overlook operating room nurse, Beth Goodheart, went on two medical missions to the Dominican Republic to study cultural differences.

Specialized departments and centers
Overlook has the following departments: Cancer center, Cardiology, Dental surgery, Dermatology, Gastroenterology, Intensive care unit, Internal medicine, Neurology, OB/GYN, Orthopedic services, Pathology, Pediatrics, Physical therapy, Plastic surgery, Psychiatric ward, Radiology, Rehabilitation services, Surgery, Trauma center, and Urology. Notable departments and centers are:
 osteopathic family practice.
 the Goryeb Children's Center, which also helps adolescents, is at Overlook.
 Valerie Fund Children's Cancer Center. It is a pediatric oncology cancer program.
 neonatal intensive care unit and well-baby nursery rotations.
 Neuroscience Institute offers brain tumor and epilepsy programs as well as neurointerventional radiology.
 Brain Tumor Center of New Jersey.
  Walsh Maternity Center-provides maternity and critical care services to high-risk newborns. It offers Calm Birth, an alternative approach to labor that focuses on neuromuscular release and meditation.
 Chest Pain Center.
 same-day surgery Center.
 Hernia Center.
 Wound Care Center.
 Medicare-certified home care and hospice program.
 specialized center for bariatrics.
 Epilepsy Center.
 center for health and eating disorders
 center for sleep medicine.
 heartburn center.
 neuro-interventional radiology program.

Affiliations and partnerships
Overlook has a clinical affiliation with the Sidney Kimmel Medical College of Thomas Jefferson University.

Accreditations
Overlook is accredited by the Joint Commission for Accreditation of Health Care Organizations or JCAHO. Overlook is a member of the American Hospital Association; and is a member of the Hospital Quality Alliance.

Finances
Overlook's parent, Atlantic Health system, was given an "A1" rating by Moody's Investors Service in 2009. Admissions grew 6.8% from 2007 to 2008 and there was total operating revenue of $1.1 billion with a 2% profit margin, according to one source. The president and chief executive of Atlantic Health System in 2009 was Joseph Trunfio.

Overlook is non-profit, and like many hospitals, has to turn to donations to make ends meet. In 2007, the foundation began a campaign to raise $100 million, according to a director of the Overlook Hospital Foundation. Donations will help Overlook "expand from being a local institution to a regional medical center." There is an Overlook Hospital Foundation Board with trustees who serve on three-year terms. Dr. John F. Vigorita, M.D., was president in 2009.

Atlantic Health owns an insurance company in the Cayman Islands entitled AHS Insurance Limited whose purpose is to pay claims against its hospitals. A spokesperson for Atlantic Health in 2009 described this as a "standard business structure." It claimed to have paid more than $2.5 million in taxes on its revenue generating, for profit businesses in 2007, such as parking garages and real estate holdings.

While hospitals are tax exempt, they pay taxes on the revenue-producing parts. One estimate was that interns (resident) salaries for the first year were $48,000, second year $51,000, third year $54,000, for programs affiliated with the AOA. Overlook has residency programs for doctors. As an employer, Overlook offers some employees subsidized housing, child care, meal cards, state-of-the-art libraries, online resources, and a complete benefits package. Overlook runs a cafeteria in conjunction with Baltimore-based Donna's Restaurants, Inc. The hospital pays Donna's for use of its brand name as well as methods of operation and recipes. The neurosciences research center at Overlook cost $15 million. The hospital tries to hold down costs by using special software to track expenses.

Controversies
In the early 1990s, Overlook, a hospital in northern New Jersey and away from the large urban centers, was contrasted with the urban hospital of St. Joseph's Regional Medical Center. St. Joseph's had a much greater percentage of charity patients; a reporter wrote: "the bills of patients who have health insurance or who can otherwise pay are marked up 33 percent, the surcharge going to pay for charity care;" in contrast, Overlook, which has a wealthier client base, only had a 6 percent charity markup. As a result, Overlook operated with a surplus while St. Joseph's was cash-strapped. Since Overlook could pay suppliers on time, it qualified for discounts based on the "quantity of its purchases" while the urban hospital had to pay extra charges.

Legal controversies

On June 21, 2012, the U.S. Department of Justice announced that AHS Hospital Corp., Atlantic Health System Inc., and Overlook Hospital agreed to pay the United States $8,999,999 to settle allegations that they violated the False Claims Act by allegedly overbilling Medicare.   The settlement is part of the Health Care Fraud Prevention and Enforcement Action Team (HEAT) initiative.

The settlement resolves allegations that Overlook Hospital, owned and operated by AHS Hospital Corporation, and Atlantic Health Systems Inc., overbilled Medicare for patients who were treated on an inpatient basis when they should have been treated as either observation patients or on an outpatient basis.

The settlement partially resolves a False Claims Act suit filed by former employees of Overlook Hospital in U.S. ex rel. Doe et al. v. AHS Hospital Corp., et al., Civ. No. 08-2042 (D.N.J.).

Rail trail at Overlook

Area residents have proposed a 7.3-mile pedestrian linear park along the main line of the abandoned Rahway Valley Railroad. The rail trail would run eastbound from the medical center on the edge of downtown Summit  and head south along the old railbed through  Springfield,  Union, Kenilworth and ending at the southwest edge of Roselle Park at the Cranford border.  A northern portion of the rail trail on the RVRR main line is under construction as the Summit Park Line, with a footbridge over Morris Avenue installed in October 2022. In parallel, advocates have been pushing for immediate development of the portion south of Route 22, running past the Galloping Hill Golf Course through Kenilworth and Roselle Park. The New Jersey Department of Transportion, which owns the railbed, has been working to clear it in anticipation of possible future trail use.

See also
 List of hospitals in New Jersey

References

External links
 Atlantic Health website

Hospitals in New Jersey
Summit, New Jersey
Hospitals established in 1906
Buildings and structures in Union County, New Jersey
1906 establishments in New Jersey